Milap Milan Zaveri, also known as Milap Zaveri, is an Indian film director and writer who has worked in blockbusters like Shootout at Wadala, Satyameva Jayate and Marjaavaan. He started his career as a dialogue writer in 2002 with the film Yeh Mohabbat Hai. In 2010 he made his directorial debut with the film Jaane Kahan Se Aayi Hai.

He announced his decision to leave Twitter after spreading fake news about a film director's death.

Filmography

References

External links 
 

Hindi-language film directors
21st-century Indian film directors
Living people
Year of birth missing (living people)
Indian male screenwriters